Patrick Schranner (born 30 March 1991 in Ingolstadt) is a German racing driver.

Career 
Schranner began his racing career in karting in 2000. He remained in karting until 2008. Amongst others he won 2007 the ADAC Kart Masters - KF2 and became runner-up in the German Challenger Kart Championship. In 2009 he began his formula racing career. He competed in the ADAC Formel Masters for KUG Motorsport. In addition he was supported by the ADAC Stiftung Sport. Schranner remained with KUG Motorsport for 2010 and participated in the ADAC Formel Masters for the second season. He won five races and became runner-up with 255 points to 315 behind Richie Stanaway, who dominated the season.

As of 2011 Schranner competes in the German Formula Three Championship, driving for HS Engineering.

Personal life 
Schranner was trained as an auto mechanic.

Career summary 
 2000–2008: Karting
 2009: ADAC Formel Masters (5th position)
 2010: ADAC Formel Masters (2nd position)
 2011: German Formula Three Championship

References

External links 
 
 

1991 births
Living people
German racing drivers
ADAC Formel Masters drivers
German Formula Three Championship drivers
Sportspeople from Ingolstadt
Racing drivers from Bavaria